The Eagle of the Sea is a 1926 American silent drama film directed by Frank Lloyd, starring Florence Vidor and featuring Boris Karloff in an uncredited role. Incomplete prints of the film exist.

Cast

See also
 List of American films of 1926
 Boris Karloff filmography

References

External links

1926 films
1920s historical drama films
American silent feature films
American black-and-white films
American historical drama films
Films directed by Frank Lloyd
Films produced by B. P. Schulberg
Films about Andrew Jackson
Paramount Pictures films
Cultural depictions of Jean Lafitte
1926 drama films
1920s American films
Silent American drama films
Silent historical drama films
1920s English-language films